Darryl Edgar Hall (born August 1, 1966) is a former Grey Cup champion and all-star Canadian Football League defensive back. He also played 3 years in the National Football League with the Denver Broncos and San Francisco 49ers.

References

1966 births
Living people
American football defensive backs
Canadian football defensive backs
American players of Canadian football
Calgary Stampeders players
Denver Broncos players
San Francisco 49ers players
Sportspeople from Santa Barbara County, California
Washington Huskies football players
People from Oscoda, Michigan
People from Lompoc, California
Players of American football from California